Cocorico! Monsieur Poulet ("Cock-a-doodle-do! Mister Chicken") is a 1977 Franco-Nigerien road movie by "Dalarou", a pseudonym for Damouré Zika, Lam Ibrahim Dia and Jean Rouch.

Production
Cocorico! Monsieur Poulet was filmed in and around Niamey, Niger on 16 mm film in 1974. Much of the film was improvised. Damouré Zika used the money he made from Petit à petit (1970) to buy the Citroën 2CV featured in the film.

Synopsis 
Lam, owner of a home-built Citroën 2CV named “Patience”, and his apprentice Tallou, drive into the countryside to buy chickens to sell in Niamey. Damouré, an opportunist, joins them on this one-day trip. They encounter adversity, a "demon", and are forced to make multiple crossings of the Niger River.

Reception
Rembert Hüser wrote that in Cocorico! Monsieur Poulet "the technology fetish of Western society gets thoroughly dismantled."

References

External links
 

Films directed by Jean Rouch
1977 films
Nigerien drama films
Docufiction films
Niamey
Citroën 2CV
Films set in Niger
1970s comedy road movies